The 1874 Manitoba general election was held on December 30, 1874.

Persons elected:

References 

1874
1874 elections in Canada
1874 in Manitoba
December 1874 events